Will Simpson may refer to:

 Will Simpson (Ackley Bridge), fictional character
 Will Simpson (comics), Northern Irish comic book illustrator
 Will Simpson (equestrian) (born 1959), American Olympic show jumper
 Will Simpson, a version of the character Nuke (Marvel Comics), in the TV series Jessica Jones
 Will Simpson, 35th mayor of Ashland, Kentucky

See also
William Simpson (disambiguation)
Bill Simpson (disambiguation)